Dave Stewart may refer to:

Music
 Dave Stewart (musician and producer) (born 1952), English musician and record producer best known for his work with Eurythmics
 Dave Stewart (keyboardist) (born 1950), former member of Egg, Hatfield and the North, National Health, Bruford, who works with vocalist Barbara Gaskin
 Dave Stewart (trombonist), bass trombonist and music teacher based in London

Sport
 Dave Stewart (baseball) (born 1957), former pitcher in Major League Baseball and 1989 World Series MVP
 Dave Stewart (footballer, born 1958), Northern Irish footballer (Hull City, Scunthorpe United, Northern Ireland)
 Dave Stewart (Scottish footballer) (born 1978), Scottish footballer for Dumbarton
 Dave Stewart (soccer), retired American soccer forward

Other
 Dave Stewart (artist), colorist in the comics industry
 Dave Stewart (EastEnders), fictional character in EastEnders

See also
 David Stewart (disambiguation)
 David Stuart (disambiguation)